McGirt v. Oklahoma, 591 U.S. ___ (2020), was a landmark United States Supreme Court case which ruled that, as pertaining to the Major Crimes Act, much of the eastern portion of the state of Oklahoma remains as Native American lands of the prior Indian reservations of the Five Civilized Tribes, never disestablished by Congress as part of the Oklahoma Enabling Act of 1906. As such, prosecution of crimes by Native Americans on these lands falls into the jurisdiction of the tribal courts and federal judiciary under the Major Crimes Act, rather than Oklahoma's courts.

McGirt was related to Sharp v. Murphy, 591 U.S. ___ (2020), heard in the 2018–19 term on the same question but which was believed to be deadlocked due to Justice Neil Gorsuch's recusal; Gorsuch recused because he had prior judicial oversight of the case. Sharp was decided per curiam alongside McGirt.

In the wake of McGirt, Oklahoma state courts began reviewing and vacating past criminal cases heard at state courts involving Native Americans and transferred their overview to federal courts. However, this included crimes where the defendants were non-Native Americans but the victims were, which state government and law authorities believed was beyond the intent of the McGirt decision. In 2022, the Supreme Court ruled in Oklahoma v. Castro-Huerta that jurisdiction to prosecute non-Native Americans who commit crimes against Native Americans on tribal lands was jointly held by federal and state governments.

Background

Prior to its statehood in 1907, about half of the land in Oklahoma, including the Tulsa metro area today, had belonged to the Five Civilized Tribes: the Cherokee, Choctaw, Chickasaw, Creek, and Seminole tribal nations, whose nickname arose from their adoption of Anglo-American culture. There had been several decades of warfare and conflict during the 19th century between the Native Americans and the United States over the lands on which the Natives lived, arising from White Americans' efforts to change the Natives from what they viewed as "savage" to their view of "civilized". Eventually, these conflicts led to the Trail of Tears, an over 1,000 mile march from the Eastern US to Oklahoma that the US Government required the Native Americans to endure, resulting in the establishment of reservations. By 1906, the US Congress passed the Oklahoma Enabling Act, which intended to disestablish the reservations, thereby enabling Oklahoma's statehood. The former reservation lands, those of the Five Civilized Tribes as well as the other tribes in the state, were allocated by tribe into areas that gave suzerainty governing rights to the tribe to handle internal matters for Native Americans within the boundaries, but otherwise the state retained jurisdiction for non-Native Americans and for all other purposes such as law enforcement and prosecution.

In Sharp v. Murphy, Patrick Murphy, a citizen of the Muscogee-Creek Nation, admitted to committing murder in the state of Oklahoma, and was subsequently tried by the state courts around 2015. During these trials, Murphy argued that the language of the Oklahoma Enabling Act did not specify that the Native American reservations were disestablished, and because he had committed the murder within the Muscogee reservation territory, that his crime was subject to federal jurisdiction and not state under the Major Crimes Act. This argument was rejected by the state and on its first appeal within the federal courts, but at the Tenth Circuit in 2017, the court found in favor of Murphy's argument that the Enabling Act did fail to disestablish the territories, and thus Murphy should have been prosecuted by the federal courts. Judge Neil Gorsuch was a member of the Tenth Circuit panel at the time. The state petitioned to the Supreme Court in 2018, which agreed to hear the case. By then, Gorsuch had been elevated to the Supreme Court, and he recused himself from all hearings on the case. Because only eight out of nine Justices heard the case, it remained unresolved at the end of the 2018–2019 term; the Court had stated plans to hold another hearing on the case in the 2019–20 term but had not set a date. Many court analysts believed the case to be deadlocked due to Gorsuch's recusal.

Statements of the case
Jimcy McGirt was an enrolled member of the Seminole tribe. In 1991, having recently been discharged from prison, he moved in with and married another member of the tribe at Broken Arrow, who was 10 years his senior. McGirt's wife had a granddaughter, whom McGirt would sexually abuse on an almost-daily basis when she was just four years old. Jimcy McGirt threatened the girl in order to get her to not speak about the crimes. McGirt was arrested on November 4, 1996, after turning himself in on an outstanding warrant. Bail was set at $25,000, and McGirt was released from jail in January 1997 after posting bail. He was returned to jail in May 1997 after violating bail conditions, and a new bail was set at $50,000. In June 1997, McGirt was found guilty, and was sentenced to life in prison without the possibility of parole, plus two consecutive 500-year sentences.

After Sharp was granted certiorari by the Supreme Court, McGirt sought postconviction relief on the basis of the Tenth Circuit's ruling in Sharp. Both the county and state-level court refused to grant hearing to McGirt's case, claiming he had failed to show how the state courts lacked jurisdiction in his previous court cases. McGirt subsequently petitioned to the Supreme Court to review.

Supreme Court
McGirt was one of a dozen cases in which the Supreme Court opted to use teleconferencing for oral arguments for the first time in the court's history due to the COVID-19 pandemic. The arguments for McGirt were heard on May 11, 2020. Ian Gershengorn, former Solicitor General of the United States, argued the case, after offering his services to the plaintiff. Observers to the court stated that some justices raised concerns of how ruling in favor of McGirt, in recognizing that the reservations were never disestablished, would impact not only existing convicted prisoners within the state but how the federal courts would subsequently need to handle approximately 8,000 felonies that occur annually on those lands, as well as the impact on legal matters related to businesses and other civil actions that would fall under tribal regulations rather than the state's. Attention was given to the stance of Justice Gorsuch, who appeared to doubt Oklahoma's argument that the lands were effectively disestablished. Justice Sonia Sotomayor stated that should the Court find in favor of McGirt, ruling that the reservations were never formally disestablished, Congress would be able to easily remedy the situation with legislation to affirm the disestablishment.

Majority 
The Court issued its decision on McGirt as well as a per curiam decision on Sharp following the basis of McGirt on July 9, 2020. The 5–4 majority opinion was written by Justice Neil Gorsuch and joined by Justices Ruth Bader Ginsburg, Stephen Breyer, Sonia Sotomayor, and Elena Kagan, and determined that for purposes of the Major Crimes Act, Congress had failed to disestablish the Indian reservations and thus those lands should be treated as "Indian country". Gorsuch wrote, "Today we are asked whether the land these treaties promised remains an Indian reservation for purposes of federal criminal law. Because Congress has not said otherwise, we hold the government to its word."

Dissent 
Chief Justice John Roberts wrote a dissent which was joined by Justices Samuel Alito and Brett Kavanaugh, as well as in part by Clarence Thomas. Roberts wrote of the majority decision, "The state’s ability to prosecute serious crimes will be hobbled and decades of past convictions could well be thrown out. On top of that, the court has profoundly destabilized the governance of eastern Oklahoma."

Results 
The Court's judgment reversed McGirt's denial for relief by the Oklahoma criminal court, which withdrew the state convictions. This then required a retrial by a federal court. This retrial was scheduled for October 6, 2020 in Muskogee federal court. Starting from the decision made in his Supreme Court case, McGirt was kept in jail for the duration until his federal trial as decided by a judge. This federal trial however did not occur until November 5. In this retrial, McGirt's victim, the granddaughter of his wife at the time of the incidents, recounted her accounts of the incidents. Now 28 years old, she mentioned that she had some difficulty recalling the events from when she was merely four years old. She did however tell the parts she could remember. The retrial was then set to continue the following day. After 3 days of testimonies, McGirt was found guilty again of sexually abusing his wife's granddaughter.

Impact 
The decision by the Supreme Court was seen as a significant win for Native American rights. Gorsuch's opinion was seen to acknowledge that many of the promises that Congress had made to the Native Americans in turning over reservations have gone unfulfilled, and rejected the argument presented by the state and federal government that he summarized as: "Yes, promises were made, but the price of keeping them has become too great, so now we should just cast a blind eye."

The Supreme Court's decision directly impacts Native American tribal citizens who are currently convicted under state law for crimes committed on the former reservation lands, as well as for any future descendants that may be arrested for similar crimes covered by the Major Crimes Acts, as their prosecution would become a matter of the federal courts and not the state. At the time, about 1,900 of the prisoners in the Oklahoma system met these conditions, but only around 10% qualified for rehearings to transfer to the federal system as they were still within the statute of limitations.

The majority decision left open other potential impacts between territorial rights that may arise, which the Court put to the state and the tribes to resolve amicably should conflicts occur. Roberts had cautioned in his dissent that this could stretch to include taxation, adoption, and environment regulation rights. Lawyers for the tribal groups asserted that the decision was narrow in affecting only Native American descendants within the lands as no land ownership changed hands. The state and the five tribes issued a joint statement after the decision, stating "The nations and the state are committed to implementing a framework of shared jurisdiction that will preserve sovereign interests and rights to self-government while affirming jurisdictional understandings, procedures, laws, and regulations that support public safety, our economy, and private property rights. We will continue our work, confident that we can accomplish more together than any of us could alone."

Aftermath

Native territorial changes 
Since the case of McGirt v. Oklahoma, there have been multiple cases to recognize the other native tribes rather than just stopping at the recognition of the Muscogee (Creek) Nation.

"Five Civilized Tribes" now recognized 
The Five Tribes received official recognition as reservations again:

 Muscogee (Creek) Nation: This is the largest of the federally recognized Muscogee tribes. They are headquartered in Okmulgee, Oklahoma. Their jurisdiction is in Creek, Hughes, Okfuskee, Okmulgee, McIntosh, Muskogee, Tulsa, and Wagoner counties. The Muscogee are a unified nation of multiple tribes.
 Cherokee Nation: This nation is federally recognized. They are considered sovereign land.
 Choctaw Nation of Oklahoma: Their tribal jurisdiction consists of  Oklahoma counties divided into 12 tribal districts. Their headquarters are in Durant, Oklahoma. They function with their own government with Judicial, Legislative, and Executive branches.
 Chickasaw Nation: This is also a three-branched self-governed native nation. Their jurisdiction takes up Byran, Carter, Coal, Garvin, Grady, Jefferson, Johnston, Love, McClain, Marshall, Murray, Pontotoc, and Stephens counties.
 Seminole Nation of Oklahoma: This nation is predominantly in Oklahoma and made up of three tribes. Their tribal complex can be found in Wewoka, Oklahoma.

Other tribes recognized
Quapaw Nation: This nation is located in parts of Ottawa County, Oklahoma in Northeast Oklahoma. They are headquartered in Quapaw, Oklahoma.

Criminal convictions
McGirt's case was reheard by a federal jury and he was found guilty on three counts of aggravated sexual abuse and sexual contact in November 2020. On August 25, 2021, McGirt was sentenced to life in prison without the possibility of parole. However, he may be granted compassionate release on or after June 1, 2027, per federal law.

In the months following the McGirt decision, several convictions of tribal members who were tried under Oklahoma state law had been undone and new trials held under federal law. Further complicating matters was the March 2021 decision of the Oklahoma Supreme Court in the case of Shaun Bosse, a non-tribal state resident who had been convicted of the murder of a Chickasaw family on tribal lands in 2012. The Oklahoma Supreme Court ruled that under McGirt, Bosse must be tried under federal law as well since the victims were Native American. In April 2021, Oklahoma Governor Kevin Stitt stated that the U.S. Supreme Court's decision had created a threat to public safety because thousands of convicted criminals may have their convictions overturned due to the Bosse ruling. The Cherokee Nation said it was "hard at work to ensure public safety" after the court "acknowledged the state illegally exerted prosecutorial authority involving Natives on our lands for decades" in McGirt and announced they had refiled over 500 cases dismissed in state courts. Following the Bosse ruling, Attorney General Michael J. Hunter filed an emergency request with the U.S. Supreme Court beseeching the judges to intervene and reconsider their McGirt decision. The Supreme Court granted the state's request on May 26, 2021, allowing the state to retain custody of Bosse pending a review of the state's petition. Bosse's case was reheard by the Oklahoma Court of Criminal Appeals in September 2021. The court ruled that the McGirt decision was not retroactive and denied release to the tribal/federal judiciary. As a result, the state withdrew its petition. Other incarcerated Native Americans continued to challenge this ruling, but the U.S. Supreme Court refused to hear these challenges, maintaining the Oklahoma Court's position that McGirt was not retroactive.

Oklahoma v. Castro-Huerta

In an attempt to overturn the McGirt ruling, either partially or in its entirety, the state filed a new petition to the Supreme Court in the Oklahoma v. Castro-Huerta case. The 2017 case involved Victor Manuel Castro-Huerta, a non-Native American convicted of neglecting a Native American child while living in Tulsa County. Castro-Huerta challenged his sentence, citing McGirt. In April 2021, the Oklahoma Court of Criminal Appeals overturned the sentencing due to jurisdiction issues raised in McGirt.  The Castro-Huerta case was one of several cases the Oklahoma Court of Criminal Appeals had applied the McGirt ruling to. The court relied on the precedent set by the McGirt case when deciding any case involving a Native American. The state believed this was excessive. The state's new Attorney General John M. O'Connor stated reversing part of McGirt, would be in the state's best interest and allow the state to protect Native American citizens and prosecute non-Natives who committed crimes against them. State law enforcement, several cities within the affected areas, and  the states of Texas, Kansas, Louisiana and Nebraska joined Oklahoma's petition specifically to have the part of the ruling affecting jurisdiction over crimes committed by non-Native Americans on Native land. The state, cities and law enforcement groups alleged that there was an increase in crimes committed against Native Americans by non-Native Americans following the McGirt decision. They went on to claim the McGirt ruling left them unable to enforce or prosecute these crimes, and existing tribal and federal law enforcement was spread too thin to handle the workload.

The Supreme Court granted certiorari of Oklahoma v. Castro-Huerta in January 2022, but specifically stated they would only look at the scope of the decision in McGirt and will not review the McGirt decision itself.

On June 29, 2022, the Court held in Castro-Huerta that Federal and State governments have concurrent jurisdiction to prosecute crimes committed by non-Native Americans against Natives on tribal land.

Law enforcement
The FBI's jurisdiction expanded in Oklahoma by almost 45% of the state's land.

See also
Aboriginal title in the United States
Former Indian reservations in Oklahoma
Indian country jurisdiction
Native American reservation politics
Off-reservation trust land
Oklahoma Tribal Statistical Area
Tribal sovereignty in the United States

References

External links

2020 in United States case law
United States Native American criminal jurisdiction case law
United States Native American treaty case law
United States Supreme Court cases
United States Supreme Court cases of the Roberts Court
Native American history of Oklahoma
United States Native American case law
Seminole
Broken Arrow, Oklahoma